A by-election was held for the New South Wales Legislative Assembly electorate of East Macquarie on 19 January 1882 because Edmund Webb resigned to accept appointment to the Legislative Council.

Webb, William Brodribb, John Sutherland and Samuel Terry were appointed to the Legislative Council at the same time, and the by-elections for Mudgee, Redfern and Wentworth were held between 11 and 23 January.

Dates

Result

Edmund Webb was appointed to the Legislative Council.

See also
Electoral results for the district of East Macquarie
List of New South Wales state by-elections

References

1882 elections in Australia
New South Wales state by-elections
1880s in New South Wales